Ömerli is a village in the District of Pozantı, Adana Province, Turkey.

References

Villages in Pozantı District